The qilin is a legendary hooved chimerical creature that appears in Chinese mythology, and is said to appear with the imminent arrival or passing of a sage or illustrious ruler. Qilin are a specific type of the  mythological family of one-horned beasts. The qilin also appears in the mythologies of other cultures, such as Japanese and Korean mythology, where it is known as the kirin, and Vietnamese mythology, where it is known as the kỳ lân.

Origins

Earliest mention of this mythical horned beast is in the poem  included in the Classic of Poetry (11th – 7th c. BCE). Spring and Autumn Annals mentioned that a lin was captured in the 14th year of Duke Ai of Lu (481 CE); Zuo Zhuan credited Confucius with identifying the lin as such.

The bisyllabic form qilin ( ~ ), which carries the same generic meaning as lin alone, is attested in works dated to the Warring States period (475 – 221 BCE).  Qi denotes the male and lin denotes the female (e.g. in Shuowen Jiezi)

The legendary image of the qilin became associated with the image of the giraffe in the Ming dynasty. The identification of the qilin with giraffes began after Zheng He's 15th-century voyage to East Africa (landing, among other places, in modern-day Somalia). The Ming Dynasty bought giraffes from the Somali merchants along with zebras, incense, and various other exotic animals. Zheng He's fleet brought back two giraffes to Nanjing and they were referred to as "qilins", with  meaning giraffe in Somali. The identification of qilin with giraffes has had a lasting influence: even today, the same word is used for the mythical animal and the giraffe in both Korean and Japanese.

Axel Schuessler reconstructs 's Old Chinese pronunciation as *gərin. Finnish linguist Juha Janhunen tentatively compares *gərin to an etymon reconstructed as *kalimV, denoting "whale"; and represented in the language isolate Nivkh and four different language families Tungusic, Mongolic, Turkic and Samoyedic, wherein *kalay(ә)ng means "whale" (in Nenets) and *kalVyǝ "mammoth" (in Enets and Nganasan). As even aborigines "vaguely familiar with the underlying real animals" often confuse the whale, mammoth, and unicorn: they conceptualized the mammoth and whale as aquatic, as well as the mammoth and unicorn possessing a single horn; for inland populations, the extant whale "remains... an abstraction, in this respect being no different from the extinct mammoth or the truly mythical unicorn." However, Janhunen cautiously remarks that "[t]he formal and semantic similarity between *kilin < *gilin ~ *gïlin 'unicorn' and *kalimV 'whale' (but also Samoyedic *kalay- 'mammoth') is sufficient to support, though perhaps not confirm, the hypothesis of an etymological connection", and also notes a possible connection between Old Chinese and Mongolian  (*)kers ~ (*)keris ~ (*)kiris "rhinoceros".

Description
Qilin generally have Chinese dragon-like features: similar heads with antlers, eyes with thick eyelashes, manes that always flow upward, and beards. The body is fully or partially scaled and often shaped like an ox, deer, or horse. They are always shown with cloven hooves. While dragons in China (and thus qilin) are also most commonly depicted as golden, qilin may be of any color or even various colors, and can be depicted as bejeweled or exhibiting a jewel-like brilliance. 

The qilin is depicted throughout a wide range of Chinese art, sometimes with parts of their bodies on fire. 

Legends tell that qilin have appeared in the garden of the legendary Yellow Emperor and in the capital of Emperor Yao; both events bore testimony to the benevolent nature of the rulers. It has also been told that the birth of the great sage Confucius was foretold by the arrival of a qilin.

Qilin as unicorns

In modern times, the depictions of qilin have often fused with the Western concept of unicorns. Qilin is often translated into English as "unicorn", and can sometimes be depicted as having a single horn – although this is misleading, as qilin may also be depicted as having two horns, and a separate word, "one-horned beast" is used in modern Chinese for "unicorns". A number of different Chinese mythical creatures can be depicted with a single horn, and a qilin, even if depicted with one horn, would be called a "one-horned qilin" in Chinese, not a "unicorn".

Nevertheless, the mythical and etymological connections between the creatures have been noted by various cultural studies and even the Chinese government, which has minted silver, gold, and platinum commemorative coins depicting both archetypal creatures.

Other cultural representations

East Asia

Japan 
Kirin, which has also come to be used as the modern Japanese word for a giraffe, are similar to qilin. Japanese art tends to depict the kirin as more deer-like than in Chinese art. Alternatively, it is depicted as a dragon shaped like a deer, but with an ox's tail instead of a lion's tail. They are also often portrayed as partially unicorn-like in appearance, but with a backwards curving horn.

Korea 
Girin or kirin is the Korean form of qilin. It is described as a maned creature with the torso of a deer, an ox tail with the hooves of a horse. The girin were initially depicted as more deer-like, however over time they have transformed into more horse-like. They were one of the four divine creatures along with the dragon, phoenix and turtle. Girin were extensively used in Korean royal and Buddhist arts.

In modern Korean, the term "girin" is used for "giraffe".

Southeast Asia

Thailand 
In Thailand, the qilin is known as "", and is a member of the pantheon of Thai Himapant forest mythical animals. It is most probable that the Gilen was introduced into the pantheon under the influence of the Tai Yai who came down from Southern China to settle in Siam in ancient times, and the legend was probably incorporated into the Himapant legends of Siam in this manner. The Gilen is a mixture of various animals, which come from differing elemental environments, representing elemental magical forces present within each personified creature. Many of the Himapant animals actually represent gods and devas of the Celestial Realms, and bodhisattvas, who manifest as personifications which represent the true nature of each creature deity through the symbolism of the various body parts amalgamated into the design of the Mythical creature.

In Phra Aphai Mani, the masterpiece epic poem of Sunthorn Phu, a renowned poet of the 18th century. There is a monster that is Sudsakorn's steed, one of the main characters in the epic. This creature was called "Ma Nin Mangkorn" ("ceylonite dragon horse"), it is depicted as it has diamond fangs, ceylonite scales, and a birthmark on the tongue. It was a mixture of horse, dragon, deer antlers, fish scales, and Phaya Nak tail, with has black sequins all over. Its appearance resembles a qilin.

Gallery

See also 

 Nian
 Chinthe
 Chimera
 Chinese dragon
 Chinese spiritual world concepts
 Fenghuang
 Four Holy Beasts
 Giraffe
 Kanglasha
 Longma
 Nongshaba
 Pakhangba
 Pixiu
 Poubi Lai
 Questing Beast
 Serpopard
 Shaanxi Kylins
 Shisa
 Singha
 Sin-you
 Sudsakorn (involving a similar creature that aided the protagonist, known as Mar Nin Mang Korn)
 Taoroinai
 Unicorn
 Xiezhi
 Yali

References

External links 
 

Chinese legendary creatures
Fictional giraffes
Four benevolent animals
Japanese legendary creatures
Korean legendary creatures
Mythological deer
Unicorns